Iota High School is a high school located in Iota, Louisiana, United States. The school is a part of the Acadia Parish School Board.

School uniforms
Beginning in the 1999–2000 school year the school district required all students to wear school uniforms.

Athletics
Iota High athletics competes in the LHSAA.

Sports sponsored by the school include:

Men's Football
Men's Basketball
Women's Basketball
Men's Baseball
Women's Softball
Men's Powerlifting
Women's Powerlifting
Men's Tennis
Women's Tennis
Men's Track & Field
Women's Track & Field
Women's Volleyball

Championships
Football Championships
(1) State Championship: 1999

References

External links

Public high schools in Louisiana
Schools in Acadia Parish, Louisiana
Educational institutions in the United States with year of establishment missing